Mordecai Fowler Ham, Jr. (April 2, 1877 – November 1, 1961), was an American Independent Baptist evangelist and temperance movement leader.

Racism and Anti-Semitism

Ham had a reputation for racism and anti-Semitism. He believed and preached on various topics based on classical anti-Semitic canards such as believing Jews had special access to political power and influence and that they represent a subversive social force. The targets for his preaching were often "nebulous rings of Jewish, Catholic or Black conspirators plotting to destroy white protestant America." In 1926 W.O. Saunders, a newspaper editor in Elizabeth City, North Carolina, confronted Ham for defaming a prominent Jew during an evangelistic campaign. Ham had accused the President of Sears, Roebuck & Company in Chicago, Julius Rosenwald, of operating inter-racial prostitution rings in Chicago that exploited white women. Saunders wrote an account of the accusations Ham had made and how Saunders had proved them false called "The Book of Ham." The Book was widely distributed, describing instances of Ham's negative views towards Jews. Ham believed in the ideas of British Israelism, that the white Anglo-Saxon races had been chosen by God. Ham outlined this in a piece of writing called "the Need of the Anglo-Israel Truth" that is featured on some websites of the Identity Movement.

However, in his booklet "The Jew" he stated unequally, "though the sins of the Jew have been many and great, yet vengeance belongeth to the Lord, and He will not let you escape if you have hated, or do hate the Jew.  Are you a Christian?  No Christian will hate the Jew.  Through him came the Christ and your Bible.  The best, the greatest and the only perfect man who ever lived on earth was a Jew by race."  Such a statement would suggest if he ever was an anti-Semite, his views changed.

Works
The Second Coming of Christ and Revelation
Believing a Lie
Light on the Dance
The Jews
The Need of the Anglo – Israel Truth
The Sabbath Question

Ham received an honorary degree from Bob Jones University in Greenville, South Carolina.

References

Balmer, R.H.  [https://www.worldcat.org/oclc/47208449 The encyclopedia of evangelicalism].Louisville, Kentucky: Westminster John Knox Press, 2002.
Dinnerstein, L. Antisemitism in America. New York : Oxford University Press. 1994.
Ham, M. The Need of the Anglo – Israel Truth. Unpublished paper.
Hill, S. Lippy, C. and Wilson, C. Encyclopedia of Religion in the South. Georgia: Mercer University Press, 2005.
 Saunders, W.O. The Book of HamSelf Published Booklett.1928.

External links
The Need for the Anglo-Israel Truth featured on Truth in History.Org
The Ministry of Mordecai Ham on The Ten Commandments Ministry website
Biography from Christian History Institute  
Biography from Swordofthelord.com
Biography by Ruckman
Biography from HigherPraise.com
Sermons by Mordecai Ham
Biography by Edward E. Ham
Guide to the Mordecai Fowler Ham papers, housed in the University of Kentucky Libraries Special Collections Research Center

1877 births
1961 deaths
Baptists from Kentucky
Baptist ministers from the United States
Southern Baptists
Southern Baptist ministers
Independent Baptist ministers from the United States
American evangelicals
American evangelists
Radio evangelists
People from Allen County, Kentucky
Religious leaders from Louisville, Kentucky
People from Chicago
American radio personalities
Burials at Cave Hill Cemetery
Critics of the Catholic Church
American temperance activists
American Christian creationists
Christian fundamentalists
Christian fundamentalism
American conspiracy theorists
British Israelism